Minuscule 189 (in the Gregory-Aland numbering), α 269 (Soden), is a Greek minuscule manuscript of the New Testament, on parchment. Palaeographically it has been assigned to the 14th century. It has marginalia.

Description 

The codex contains the text of the four Gospels, Acts of the Apostles, Catholic epistles and Pauline epistles on 452 elegant parchment leaves (size ). The text is written in one column per page, in 24 lines per page, in light-black ink, capital letters in red. The letters are small and beautiful.

There is no  (titles of chapters) at the top of the pages.

It has only one lacunae in John 19:38-21:25.

Text 

The Greek text of the codex is a representative of the Byzantine text-type. Aland placed it in Category V. Hermann von Soden classified it as member of the textual family Kr. According to the Claremont Profile Method it represents Kr in Luke 1 and Luke 20. In Luke 10 no profile was made.

History 

It was examined by Birch, Scholz, Burgon, and C. R. Gregory (1886).

It is currently housed at the Laurentian Library (Plutei. VI. 27), at Florence.

See also 

 List of New Testament minuscules
 Biblical manuscript
 Textual criticism

References

Further reading

External links 
 Minuscule 189 at the Encyclopedia of Textual Criticism

Greek New Testament minuscules
14th-century biblical manuscripts